Volodymyr Bulhakov (1 January 1947 – 18 May 2003) is a former professional Soviet football midfielder and coach.

References

External links
 

1947 births
2003 deaths
Soviet footballers
Ukrainian footballers
FC Podillya Khmelnytskyi players
FC Karpaty Lviv players
SC Lutsk players
MFC Mykolaiv players
FC Metalist Kharkiv players
FC Krystal Kherson players
Soviet Top League players
Soviet football managers
Ukrainian football managers
FC SKA-Karpaty Lviv managers
FC Krystal Kherson managers
FC Karpaty Lviv managers
FC Podillya Khmelnytskyi managers
Korona Kielce managers
FC Rava Rava-Ruska managers
Ukrainian expatriate football managers
Expatriate football managers in Poland
Association football midfielders
Sportspeople from Khmelnytskyi Oblast